Hrishikesh Mukherjee (30 September 1922 – 27 August 2006) was an Indian film director, editor and writer. He is regarded as one of the greatest filmmakers of Indian cinema. Popularly known as Hrishi-da, he directed 42 films during his career spanning over four decades, and is named the pioneer of the 'middle cinema' of India. Renowned for his social films that reflected the changing middle-class ethos, Mukherjee "carved a middle path between the extravagance of mainstream cinema and the stark realism of art cinema".

He is known for a number of films, including Anari, Satyakam, Chupke Chupke, Anupama, Anand, Abhimaan, Guddi, Gol Maal, Majhli Didi, Chaitali, Aashirwad, Bawarchi, Khubsoorat, Kissi Se Na Kehna, and Namak Haraam.

He also remained the chairman of the Central Board of Film Certification (CBFC) and of the National Film Development Corporation (NFDC). The Government of India honoured him with the Dada Saheb Phalke Award in 1999 and the Padma Vibhushan in 2001. He received the NTR National Award in 2001 and he also won eight Filmfare Awards.

Early life and background
Hrishikesh Mukherjee was born in the city of Calcutta in pre-independence India (now Kolkata) to a Bengali brahmin family. He studied science and graduated in chemistry from the University of Calcutta. He taught mathematics and science for some time.

Career
Mukherjee chose to begin working, initially as a cameraman, and then film editor, in B. N. Sircar's New Theatres in Calcutta in the late 1940s, where he learned his skills from Subodh Mitter ('Kenchida'), a well known editor of his times. He then worked with Bimal Roy in Mumbai as film editor and assistant director from 1951, participating in the landmark Roy films Do Bigha Zamin and Devdas.

His debut directorial venture, Musafir (1957), was not a success, but he persisted and received acclaim for his second film Anari in 1959. The film, crew and cast won five Filmfare Awards, with Mukherjee only losing the Best Director Award to his mentor, Bimal Roy.

In the following years he made numerous films. Some of his most notable films include: Anuradha (1960), Chhaya (1961), Asli-Naqli (1962),  Anupama (1966), Aashirwad (1968), Satyakam (1969), Guddi (1971), Anand (1971), Bawarchi (1972), Abhimaan (1973), Namak Haraam (1973), Mili (1975), Chupke Chupke (1975), Alaap (1977), Gol Maal (1979), Khubsoorat (1980) and Bemisal (1982). He was the first to introduce Dharmendra in comedy roles, through Chupke Chupke, and gave Amitabh Bachchan his big break with Anand in 1970, along with Rajesh Khanna, he also introduced Jaya Bhaduri to Hindi cinema in his film Guddi. Having worked with his mentor, Bimal Roy as an editor, in films like Madhumati, he was much sought after as an editor as well.

Later life
Mukherjee was honoured with the Dadasaheb Phalke Award by the Government of India, in 1999. Mukherjee was chairman of the Central Board of Film Certification and of the National Film Development Corporation. He was also awarded the Padma Vibhushan, the second highest civilian award for his contribution to Indian cinema by government of India in 2001 . The International Film Festival of India honoured him with a retrospective of his films in November 2005. He holds the distinction of working with almost all the top Indian stars since independence of India in 1947.

His last film was Jhooth Bole Kauwa Kaate. Since his original hero Amol Palekar had grown old he had to cast Anil Kapoor. He has also directed TV serials like Talaash.

Death
In later life, Mukherjee suffered from chronic kidney failure and would go to Lilavati Hospital for dialysis. He was admitted to Lilavati Hospital in Mumbai early on Tuesday, 6 June 2006 after he complained of uneasiness. Mukherjee died few weeks later on 27 August 2006.

Personal life
Mukherjee was married and has three daughters and two sons. His wife died more than three decades before him. 
His younger brother Dwarkanath Mukherjee helped write the screenplay for many of his films. 
He was an animal lover and had many dogs and sometimes an odd cat at his residence in Bandra, Mumbai. He was staying with only his servants and pets in the last phase of his life. Family members and friends would visit him regularly.

Awards
 2001: Padma Vibhushan by the Government of India
 2001: NTR National Award
 Rashtriya Kishore Kumar Samman from the Government of Madhya Pradesh for 1997-1998

Berlin International Film Festival
 1961: Golden Bear: Nomination: Anuradha

Filmfare Awards
 1956: Filmfare Best Editing Award: Naukari
 1959: Filmfare Best Editing Award: Madhumati
 1970: Filmfare Best Screenplay Award: Anokhi Raat
 1972: Filmfare Best Movie Award: Anand shared with N. C. Sippy
 1972: Filmfare Best Editing Award: Anand
 1972: Filmfare Best Story Award: Anand
 1981: Filmfare Best Movie Award: Khubsoorat shared with N. C. Sippy
 1994: Filmfare Lifetime Achievement Award – South (1994)

Kerala State Film Awards

 1970: Kerala State Film Award for Best Editor: Priya
 1974: Kerala State Film Award for Best Editor: Nellu
National Film Awards
1957: Certificate of Merit for Third Best Feature Film in Hindi – Musafir
 1959: President's Silver Medal for Best Feature Film in Hindi – Anari
 1960: President's Gold Medal for the All India Best Feature Film – Anuradha
1966: President's Silver Medal for Best Feature Film in Hindi – Anupama
1968: President's Silver Medal for Best Feature Film in Hindi – Aashirwad
1969: President's Silver Medal for Best Feature Film in Hindi – Satyakam
1970: President's Silver Medal for Best Feature Film in Hindi – Anand
 1999: Dada Saheb Phalke Award

Filmography

Films as director

Films as editor, writer or assistant director

TV serials
Hum Hindustani (1986)
 Talaash (1992)
Dhoop Chhaon
Rishte
Ujaale Ki Or
Agar Aisa Ho Toh

Further reading
 Great Masters of Indian Cinema: The Dadasaheb Phalke Award Winners, by D. P. Mishra, Publications Division, Ministry of Information and Broadcasting, Govt. of India, 2006. . page 122.

References

External links
 
 Hrishikesh Mukherjee at AllMovie

Bengali Hindus
Bengali film directors
Film directors from Kolkata
University of Calcutta alumni
20th-century Indian film directors
Recipients of the Padma Vibhushan in arts
1922 births
2006 deaths
Deaths from kidney failure
Hindi-language film directors
Dadasaheb Phalke Award recipients
Kerala State Film Award winners
Recipients of the Padma Shri in arts
Producers who won the Best Feature Film National Film Award
Directors who won the Best Feature Film National Film Award